Graphops marcassita is a species of leaf beetle. It is found in North America.

Subspecies
These two subspecies belong to the species Graphops marcassita:
 Graphops marcassita marcassita (Crotch, 1873) i c g
 Graphops marcassita pugitana Blake, 1955 i c g
Data sources: i = ITIS, c = Catalogue of Life, g = GBIF, b = Bugguide.net

References

Further reading

 

Eumolpinae
Articles created by Qbugbot
Beetles described in 1873
Taxa named by George Robert Crotch
Beetles of North America